Thunder Thighs is Kimya Dawson's seventh solo album, released by Great Crap Factory on October 18, 2011. It received generally favorable reviews from critics.

Track listing

References

2011 albums
Kimya Dawson albums